Atatürk Oto Sanayi is an underground rapid transit station on the M2 line of the Istanbul Metro. It is located under Büyükdere Avenue just north of Maslak. The station opened on 31 January 2009 as part of the northern extension of the M2. It served as the northern terminus until 2 September 2010 when the line was extended further north to Darüşşafaka. Atatürk Oto Sanayi has an island platform serviced by two tracks.

Layout

References

Railway stations opened in 2009
Istanbul metro stations
Sarıyer
2009 establishments in Turkey
Metro Istanbul